Sarkhan Aliyev (born 27 August 1998) is an Azerbaijani boxer. He participated at the 2021 AIBA World Boxing Championships, being awarded the bronze medal in the light middleweight event.

References

External links 

1998 births
Living people
Place of birth missing (living people)
Azerbaijani male boxers
Light-middleweight boxers
AIBA World Boxing Championships medalists